Royal Palm Beach High School (RPBHS) also known as Royal Palm is a public high school in Royal Palm Palm Beach, Florida with an enrollment of over 2,000 students. The school is a part of the School District of Palm Beach County.

Notable alumni
 Jeff Choquette, racing driver
 Jordan Dangerfield (born 1990), NFL player
 Kason Gabbard, MLB starting pitcher
 Triston McKenzie, MLB pitcher, high school draftee 2015
 Jimmy Moreland, NFL player
 Jarrod Saltalamacchia, MLB catcher
 Matt Willhite, Democratic Representative District 86
 Fred Johnson (offensive lineman) (born 1997), is an NFL player. He is currently an offensive lineman for the Tampa Bay Buccaneers. Former player for the Cincinnati Bengals.

References

High schools in Palm Beach County, Florida
Public high schools in Florida
Educational institutions established in 1997
1997 establishments in Florida